The Battle of Vermilion Bayou or Battle of Pinhook Bridge was fought on April 17, 1863, the third battle in a series of running battles between Union Major General Nathaniel Prentice Banks and Confederate Major General Richard Taylor. The battle was fought after both the Battle of Fort Bisland and the Battle of Irish Bend. On October 9, 1863 a skirmish with Confederate & Federal cavalry occurred at the same location.

Prelude
After Nathaniel Prentice Banks had outmaneuvered Richard Taylor's Army of Western Louisiana out from the Bayou Teche region, he continued his movements towards his main objective of Alexandria, Louisiana. The Confederates were trying to slow him down as much as they could and they once again tried slowing him down right outside of Vermilion Bayou.

Battle

As Richard Taylor's small army was withdrawing up the Teche, they crossed a bridge going over Vermilion Bayou. In order to slow Banks' army down, Taylor's men lit the bridge on fire and stopped for a rest. Banks, who was in pursuit of Taylor, split his army into two columns and sent one towards the bridge and the other column around the side.

As soon as the first column came within sight of the bridge, Confederate artillery began shelling the Union soldiers. After a while, Union artillery came up and a series of counter-battery exchanges ensued.

During the night, Taylor, knowing himself to be outnumbered, withdrew his force again.

Aftermath
Though Taylor had not dealt Banks a defeat, he was continually slowing Banks down from reaching Alexandria, Louisiana, and his ultimate objective of Port Hudson, Louisiana.

Notes

References
 Ayres, Thomas., Dark and Bloody Ground : The Battle of Mansfield and the Forgotten Civil War in Louisiana, Cooper Square Press, 2001.
 Parrish, T. Michael,  Richard Taylor, Soldier Prince of Dixie, University of North Carolina Press, 1992.
 Taylor, Richard, Destruction and Reconstruction : Personal experiences of the late war, Time-Life Books, 1983.

External links
 National Park Service Battle Summary
 CWSAC Report Update

Vermilion Bayou
Vermilion Bayou
Vermilion Bayou
Vermilion
Lafayette Parish, Louisiana
1863 in Louisiana
April 1863 events